The Duo Normand is a two-man team time trial (against the clock) for elite racing cyclists. Held annually at Marigny-le-Lozon in Normandy, France, it was instituted in 1982. Launched by a local cycling association, the Duo Normand takes place on a road circuit of more than  every September.

History 
The first three editions were for amateurs only; professionals were admitted from the fourth edition, in 1985.

In 2016 a British rider died following a collision with a support car, 200m before the finish.

Winners

References

External links

Cycle races in France
Recurring sporting events established in 1982
1982 establishments in France
Sport in Manche
UCI Europe Tour races